Queers in love at the End of the World, also stylized as queers in love at the end of the world, is a hypertext game created with Twine. Developed by Anna Anthropy in 2013 for the Ludum Dare Game Jam, the short, ten-second narrative faces players with how to interact with their partner before „(e)verything is wiped away”.

As of 2023, the game is hosted on Anthropy's Itch.io page.

Plot 
In just ten seconds, players read through short paragraphs and selected highlighted text in order to dictate how they want to interact with their partner before the end of the world. About the origin of the work, Anthropy writes, „If you only had ten seconds left with your partner, what would you do with them? What would you say? It’s a game about the transformative, transcendent power of queer love, and is dedicated to every queer I’ve loved, no matter how briefly, or for how long.”

Reception
Claudia Lo praised the game's embrace of queer temporality, as described in José Esteban Muñoz's Cruising Utopia. At The Guardian, Cara Ellison stated that Queers „evokes an itinerant life better than any other game”.

References

External links 
Queers in Love at the End of the World on Itch.io

2013 video games
Browser games
LGBT-related video games
Romance video games
Twine games
Video games developed in the United States
Video games designed by Anna Anthropy
Electronic literature works
2010s interactive fiction